Say It with Music (A Touch of Latin) is an album by Ray Conniff, His Orchestra and Chorus. It was released in 1960 on the Columbia label (catalog no. CL-1490).

The album debuted on Billboard magazine's popular albums chart on October 10, 1960, peaked at No. 4, and remained on that chart for 28 weeks.

AllMusic later gave the album a rating of three-and-a-half stars.

Track listing
Side 1
 "Bésame Mucho" (C. Velazquez, S. Skylar) [2:37]
 "Stranger in Paradise" (G. Forrest, R. Wright) [3:03]
 "Summertime" (D. Heyward, G. Gershwin) [2:38]
 "I've Got You Under My Skin" (Cole Porter) [3:00]
 "Too Young" (S. Lippman, S. Dee) [2:39]
 "Softly, As in a Morning Sunrise" (Oscar Hammerstein II, Sigmund Romberg) [3:20]

Side 2
 "Just One of Those Things" (Cole Porter) [3:22]
 "Deep Purple" (M. Parrish, P. DeRose) [1:30]
 "Brazil" (Ary Barroso, Bob Russell) [3:03]
 "Night and Day" (Cole Porter) [3:17]
 "Temptation" (A. Freed, N. Brown) [3:37]
 "Say It with Music" (Irving Berlin) [2:26]

References

1960 albums
Columbia Records albums
Ray Conniff albums